The Brazil-United States Political-Military Agreement (Washington Accords) which came into an effect on 23 May 1942, was a prelude to formal entering of Brazil into World War II. Its implementation was carried out by the Joint Brazil-United States Military Commission (JBUSMC). It was a result on a series of consultations in Rio de Janeiro since 1941, during which a number of various political and business decisions have been made. The term "Washington Accords" may refer to these preceding negotiations as well.

The consequences of the Agreement included the second rubber boom in Brazil.

References

Brazil in World War II
Brazil–United States military relations
1942 in Brazil
1942 in the United States
1942 in military history
Vargas Era